Belaïd Lacarne (born 26 October 1940 in Sidi Bel Abbès) is a retired Algerian football referee.

Lacarne refereed one match in the 1982 FIFA World Cup in Spain between Argentina and Hungary. He was also a Linesman for five matches in the tournament including the third and fourth place decider between Poland and France. In addition, he was an official at the 1980 Summer Olympics.

He was nominated onto the Confederation of African Football committee in 2002, a member of the Refereeing Committee for the 2004 African Cup of Nations, and is currently a member of the FIFA Referee Committee.

References

External links
  
 
 
 

1940 births
Algerian football referees
FIFA World Cup referees
1982 FIFA World Cup referees
Olympic football referees
Football referees at the 1980 Summer Olympics
Living people
People from Sidi Bel Abbès
21st-century Algerian people